Kazem Jalali (born 25 July 1967) is an Iranian conservative politician and member of the Majlis from Tehran, Rey, Shemiranat and Eslamshahr district. In June 2009, he was the spokesman for the foreign relations committee of the Majlis.

Kazem Jalali holds a PhD of political science from Imam Sadiq University, Tehran. Jalali was a senior member of Moderation and Development Party, but he resigned in 2007. He is president of Followers of Wilayat fraction and is close to Ali Larijani.

References

Living people
Moderation and Development Party politicians
Members of the 6th Islamic Consultative Assembly
Members of the 7th Islamic Consultative Assembly
Members of the 8th Islamic Consultative Assembly
Members of the 9th Islamic Consultative Assembly
Members of the 10th Islamic Consultative Assembly
Followers of Wilayat fraction members
Imam Sadiq University alumni
1967 births
Iranian diplomats
Ambassadors of Iran to Russia
People from Gorgan